Diona may refer to:

People with the  given name
Diona Doherty (born 1989), Irish actress
Diona Reasonover (born 1992), American actress

Places
Diona, Mali, a village and the seat of Korarou, Mali
Diona, Illinois, an unincorporated community in Coles County, Illinois, United States